Afreen Khan is a Pakistani politician who has been a member of the National Assembly of Pakistan, since August 2018.

Political career
He was elected to the National Assembly of Pakistan as a candidate of Muttahida Majlis-e-Amal (MMA) from Constituency NA-11 (Kohistan-cum-Lower Kohistan-cum-Kolai Palas Kohistan) in 2018 Pakistani general election. He received 15,859 votes and defeated an independent candidate, Dost Muhammad Shakir.

References

Living people
Pakistani MNAs 2018–2023
Muttahida Majlis-e-Amal MNAs
Year of birth missing (living people)